Sonny Bryan's Smokehouse is a well-known BBQ restaurant in Dallas, Texas that was founded by William Jennings Bryan Jr. (known as Sonny) in 1958 near the University of Texas Southwestern Medical Center. It has seven locations in the Dallas – Fort Worth Metroplex (DFW) while closing all franchise units in Utah by mid-2014.  Sonny Bryan's also has one of the largest catering companies in DFW.

History

The Bryan family has operated barbecue restaurants in the Dallas area for over a century. Sonny's grandfather, Elias Bryan, first opened his Bryan's Barbecue in 1910 while Sonny's father William Jennings "Red" Bryan opened Red Bryan's Smokehouse in 1930. Sonny opened his Sonny Bryan's Smokehouse in 1958 and ran it until 1989 when he sold it to a group of Dallas investors. Bryan died from cancer just a few months after the sale.

While Bryan was alive, he had only maintain a single location and never franchised. Although the new management vowed to keep the original location the same, they started building additional locations. The first new location opened in the West End in 1991.

Under the new management, Sonny Bryan's expanded, including new locations at Love Field in 2011, one a major department store in a mall (1993-2011), plus three locations in Utah, with the first Utah location opened in 2011. The current CEO is Brent Harmon. At one point during the early 2010s, the company had as many as 10 locations in Texas plus 3-4 locations in Utah. By August 2014, locations in Texas were reduced to seven while all of the locations in Utah were closed.

As of mid 2014, current locations in Texas include Inwood (original location), Richardson, West End, Las Colinas, Lovers Lane, Downtown (Dallas), and Fort Worth.  Recently closed locations in Texas include Preston & Forest, Macy’s Galleria, and Love Field.  Former locations in Utah include Sandy, Foothill, Valley Fair, Cottonwood Heights, and Downtown (Salt Lake City).

To cater to workers on the late shift at the nearby hospitals, the original location switched to a 24 hours operations in May 2016 while the other locations maintained their regular schedules.

As a result of the COVID19 pandemic, only three location survived by April 2021, the original location in Inwood, Lovers Lane, and Richardson.

Distinguishing features

Some locations use old school desks as dining tables, which were first used by Sonny Bryan himself at the original location.

Noted customers include Julia Child, Lyndon Baines Johnson, Dean Fearing, Emeril Lagasse, Larry Hagman, Jimmy Buffett, King Khan and the Shrines, and George W. Bush.

Awards

The restaurant won a James Beard Foundation Award in 2000, a Best Barbecue Dallas award from the Dallas Observer in 2007, and several Readers' Choice Best Barbecue Awards from D Magazine for 2010, 2011, and 2012 In 2015, the chain was declared as the fourth best southern barbeque by the readers of USA Today.

In the media

It has been featured in a Dallas-based episode of the Travel Channel show Man v. Food Nation, in 2011, the Dallas episode of the Cooking Channel show The Originals with Emeril, the barbecue episode of the Food Network show Rachael Ray's Tasty Travels, and the Travel Channel show 101 More Amazing Places to Chowdown, in 2014. It has been written about and favorably reviewed in Southern Living, People (magazine), the Los Angeles Times, the New York Times, the Chicago Tribune, the Houston Chronicle, and culinary books by Jane and Michael Stern

See also
 List of barbecue restaurants
 List of James Beard America's Classics

References

External links
 

Barbecue restaurants in the United States
Companies based in Dallas
Restaurants in Dallas
Restaurants established in 1958
James Beard Foundation Award winners
1958 establishments in Texas